Ahmad ibn Mubarak was the seventh Tayyibi Isma'ili Dāʿī al-Muṭlaq in Yemen, from 1229 to his death in 1230.

Life
Syedna Ahmad was the son of Mubarak, brother of 5th Dai Syedna Ali. Upon assuming office, he dispatched emissaries to various places in Yemen and India. San'aa remained his seat of administration and he maintained cordial relations with various rulers in Yemen.

He was succeeded by al-Husayn, the son of Ali ibn Muhammad.

References

Sources
 

Year of birth unknown
1230 deaths
Banu al-Walid al-Anf
Tayyibi da'is
13th century in Yemen
13th-century Arabs
13th-century Ismailis
13th-century Islamic religious leaders